Reynolds is an unincorporated community in Owyhee County, Idaho, United States.

The Camp Lyon Site, which is listed on the National Register of Historic Places, is located near Reynolds.

References

Unincorporated communities in Owyhee County, Idaho
Unincorporated communities in Idaho